Rwanda Cricket Stadium, also known as Kicukiro Oval, is a cricket ground in Kigali, Rwanda. The stadium is officially titled the Gahanga International  Cricket Stadium. The ground is Rwanda's first dedicated international cricket ground and it quickly became a prominent ground in African cricket.

History 
In August 2011, the Rwanda Cricket Stadium Foundation was formed as a charity, run on a not for profit basis, with the aim of building and managing the first ever dedicated international cricket ground in Rwanda. The ground was completed in March 2017. It is located on a  site on the edge of Kigali, Rwanda's capital.  

The charity is run by a team of cricket enthusiasts from the UK and Rwanda in partnership with the Marylebone Cricket Club Foundation. 

In 2012, Brian Lara agreed to become one of the ground's Patrons. The Stadium is also supported by former British Prime Minister David Cameron, Andrew Mitchell, Jonathan Agnew, Heather Knight, Peter Gummer, Baron Chadlington

In 2016, Rwanda captain Eric Dusingizimana achieved a Guinness World Record for batting 51 continuous hours at Amaharo Stadium in Remera. This was done to raise funds for the construction of the ground.

Once opened, the ground quickly gained prominence in African cricket and hosted various ICC events. In 2018, the ground was selected to host the matches in the 2018–19 ICC World Twenty20 Africa Qualifier Eastern Sub-Region group. Once all associate members were given T20I status in 2019, the ground hosted its first T20I on 18 August 2021. 

The stadium also hosted the 2019 Kwibuka Women's T20 Tournament, a women's cricket tournament, in remembrance of the victims of the 1994 Rwandan genocide. Their successful hosting of multi-national tournaments during peak COVID-19 pandemic following the safety protocols had led to being given more tournaments subsequently.

In November 2022, the ground surpassed the Harare Sports Club as the cricket oval to host the most T20I matches in Africa.

Notable Events 
The following notable events were hosted here with ICC International Status:

 2021 ICC Men's T20 World Cup Africa Qualifier
 Qualifier A, Qualifier B, Regional Final
 2022–23 ICC Men's T20 World Cup Africa Qualifier
 Qualifier A, Qualifier B
 Kwibuka T20 Tournament
 2019, 2021, 2022
 2022 East Africa T20 Series

Bilateral Series 

 Ghanaian cricket team in Rwanda in 2021

International record

Twenty20 International centuries 
Three T20I centuries have been scored at the venue.

Twenty20 International five-wicket hauls 
Four 20I five-wicket haul has been taken at this venue.

Women's Twenty20 International centuries 
Four WT20I centuries have been scored at the venue.

Women's Twenty20 International five-wicket hauls
Three WT20I five-wicket haul has been taken at this venue.

References

External links
 Rwanda Cricket Stadium Foundation
 espncricinfo magazine
 UNIVERSITY CRICKET at OXFORD

Cricket venues in Rwanda
Sports venues in Kigali
Stadiums under construction
Multi-purpose stadiums in Rwanda